Robert Scott Speedman (born September 1, 1975) is a British-Canadian actor. He is known for portraying Ben Covington in the coming-of-age drama television series Felicity, Lycan–Vampire hybrid Michael Corvin in the gothic horror–action Underworld films, and Barry "Baz" Blackwell in the TNT crime drama series Animal Kingdom. His other film work includes Duets, Dark Blue, XXX: State of the Union, The Strangers, Barney's Version, The Vow, and Crimes of the Future. In 2021, he returned to Grey's Anatomy as a main character following a guest role in season 14 as Dr. Nick Marsh.

Early life
Speedman was born in London, to Scottish parents Mary (née Campbell), a primary school teacher and champion runner, and Roy Speedman (1944–1999), a department store buyer. His sister, Tracey, died from cancer on February 8, 2016. At the age of four, he and his family moved to Toronto. He was a competitive swimmer who attended Earl Haig Secondary School's now defunct gifted athlete program. As a member of the Canadian Junior National Swim Team, Speedman placed ninth at the 1992 Olympic trials.  Suffering a neck injury soon after, he was forced to leave the sport. To find a new focus outside of athletics, Speedman became interested in acting. He went on to attend the University of Toronto and York University to study his craft.

Career
Encouraged by a friend to appear on Speaker's Corner, a viewer open-forum run by Toronto's Citytv, Speedman expressed interest in auditioning for the role of Robin in the film Batman Forever, which was being cast in Toronto at the time. Though the appearance earned him an audition, Speedman was not cast in the role, which was ultimately given to Chris O'Donnell. The audition did, however, give Speedman the exposure he needed and he quickly arranged an agent and began auditioning for Canadian television and film roles.

Speedman made his television debut in 1995, appearing in an episode of the series Kung Fu: The Legend Continues, followed by a recurring role in the series Nancy Drew that same year. After appearing in several small TV roles, Speedman decided to go to New York City to study for a short time at the Neighborhood Playhouse before dropping out and returning home to Toronto. His big break came when he got a call from an American casting agent who wanted him to audition for a new series called Felicity. Portraying brooding college student Ben Covington opposite overnight star Keri Russell as Felicity, Speedman received much acclaim on the popular series. Soon after Felicity, Speedman began to get offers for more prominent roles while working on the series. In 2000, Speedman was given the role of Billy Hannan opposite Gwyneth Paltrow in the film Duets.

After ending a four-year run on Felicity, Speedman quickly found success in film. In 2002, he was cast in his first major starring role in a feature, portraying an inexperienced LAPD detective caught in a web of corruption, opposite Kurt Russell, in the police drama Dark Blue. Next, Speedman portrayed the husband of a terminally ill woman opposite fellow Canadian and high-school alumna Sarah Polley in the independent drama My Life Without Me. Speedman won a "Golden Wave Award" for his work on the film.

Later in 2003, Speedman starred opposite Kate Beckinsale in the supernatural thriller film Underworld. Making an impression on audiences in the stylized vampire–werewolf film, Speedman was honored with a Saturn Award in the category "Cinescape Face of the Future Award". Then, he went on to star alongside James Marsden in the thriller The 24th Day and Ice Cube in XXX: State of the Union. Upon the success of the first Underworld film, Speedman reprised his role as Michael Corvin in the 2006 sequel Underworld: Evolution. He appeared alongside Willem Dafoe in Anamorph and Wes Bentley in Weirdsville. Speedman also starred with Liv Tyler in the 2008 horror–thriller The Strangers, and alongside Rachel Blanchard in the mystery drama Adoration, directed by Atom Egoyan.

In July 2009, it was reported that Speedman was to star alongside Dustin Hoffman among others in the film adaption of Barney's Version. Pre-production began in August 2009, and filming took place in Rome, New York and Canada. Speedman also starred in the independent Western The Last Rites of Ransom Pride alongside Lizzy Caplan and Dwight Yoakam.
Archive footage of Speedman from the previous Underworld films was used in the 2012 & 2016 sequels, Awakening and Blood Wars; his facial likeness was superimposed on a stand-in for his character's brief role in the film. He had a supporting role as Jeremy in The Vow.

Speedman last starred as XO Sam Kendal in the ABC military drama series Last Resort, which premiered on September 27, 2012.

In June 2013, Speedman was selected to star in Ryan Murphy's HBO production called Open alongside Wes Bentley. In 2014, he co-starred with Julia Stiles in Lluís Quílez Sala thriller film Out of the Dark. He starred in various independent films such as Barefoot, The Captive, and The Monster.

He starred as Barry "Baz" Blackwell in the TNT crime drama series Animal Kingdom until the first episode of season 3. In 2018, he had a guest role on Grey's Anatomy as Dr. Nick Marsh, before becoming a series regular in season 18.

In October 2020, it was announced that Speedman had been cast in the recurring role of Matthew Engler on the third season of the Netflix thriller series You.

Personal life
Speedman is currently in a relationship with Lindsay Rae Hofmann. In May 2021, Hofmann announced her pregnancy with their first child.  The couple welcomed their daughter on October 26, 2021.

Filmography

Film

Television

References

External links

 

1975 births
20th-century Canadian male actors
21st-century Canadian male actors
Canadian expatriates in England
Canadian male film actors
Canadian male television actors
Canadian people of Scottish descent
English emigrants to Canada
English people of Scottish descent
Living people
Neighborhood Playhouse School of the Theatre alumni
People from Hammersmith
University of Toronto alumni
York University alumni